Emery may refer to:

Places

United States
 Emery, Arizona, a populated place
 Emery, Illinois
 Emery, Michigan
 Emery, Ohio, a ghost town
 Emery Park, a park in Erie County, New York
 Emery, North Carolina
 Emery, Fayette County, Pennsylvania
 Emery, Washington County, Pennsylvania
 Emery, South Dakota, a city
 Emery County, Utah
 Emery, Utah, a town in Emery County
 Emery, Wisconsin, a town

Elsewhere
 Emery, Toronto, a neighbourhood in Toronto, Ontario, Canada
 Mount Emery, a mountain on West Falkland, Falkland Islands

Businesses
 Emery Oleochemicals, a chemical company headquartered in Malaysia
 Emery Telcom, a telecommunications company in Utah
 Emery Worldwide, a former cargo airline headquartered in Redwood City, California

Other uses
 Emery (band), a post-hardcore band from Rock Hill, South Carolina
 Emery (name), people with the given or surname
 Emery (rock)
 Emery board, a type of nail file coated with emery
 Emery ball, the use of an emery board to alter a sports ball
 Emery cloth, an abrasive cloth coated in emery particles
 Emery paper, an abrasive paper coated in emery particles
 Emery Farm (Durham, New Hampshire)
 Emery Farm (Stratham, New Hampshire), on the National Register of Historic Places
 Emery Farmstead, Port Angeles, Washington, on the National Register of Historic Places
 Emery High School (disambiguation)
 Emery School, a former school building in Biddeford, Maine, on the National Register of Historic Places
 Emery Theatre, an historic multi-purpose theatre in Cincinnati, Ohio
 Operation Emery, a series of American nuclear tests (1970-1971)

See also 
 Emery House (disambiguation)
 Emory (disambiguation)
 Emery Down, village in Hampshire, England, United Kingdom